Moisés E. Molina High School is a public secondary school in the Oak Cliff area of Dallas, Texas (USA). Molina High School is part of the Dallas Independent School District and serves students from parts of southwestern Dallas and parts of Cockrell Hill.

In 2015, the school was rated "Met Standard" by the Texas Education Agency.

History
The school opened in August 1997 across Duncanville Road from Mountain View College, a community college operated by the Dallas County Community College District.

The school is named for Moisés E. Molina, a musician and retired Dallas ISD teacher; he served as a band director for W. H. Adamson High School for over 15 years.  He attended the University of Texas at Arlington and North Texas State University.  From Molina's writings:

He died in 1994 from hemochromatosis.

Athletics
The Molina Jaguars compete in the following sports:

Baseball
Basketball
Cross Country
Football
Golf
Soccer
Softball
Swimming and Diving
Tennis
Track and Field
Volleyball
Wrestling

Extracurriculars 
The school used to have the Ballet Folklórico Jaguara, an extracurricular dance program. In August 2001, the program was featured in Texas Dance Magazine.

The school also has the Jaguar Marching Band, Choir, Mariachi, Orchestra, Dance Company, Cheerleading, the Rosettes (Drill Team), etc.

School demographics
The attendance rate for students at the school is 92%, in contrast to a state average of 96%.  80% of the students at Molina are economically disadvantaged, 7% are enrolled in special education, 9% are enrolled in gifted and talented programs, and 22% are considered to be "limited English proficient."

 the ethnic makeup of the school is 89% Hispanic American, 9% African American,  1% White, non-Hispanic, 1% Asian/Pacific Islander American, and less than 1% American Indian/Alaskan Native.

The average class sizes at Molina are 23 students for English, 23 for foreign language, 23 for mathematics, 28 for science, and 22 for social studies.

Teachers at the school carry, on average, 10 years of teaching experience and 9% of the teachers on staff are first-year teachers.

Feeder patterns 
As of 2006, L. V. Stockard and part of W.E Greiner and T.W Browne are the middle schools that feeds into Molina.

The five elementary schools (all PK-6) that feed into Molina are Mary McLeod Bethune, Arturo Salazar, L.P. Cowart, 
Celestrino Mauricio Soto Jr. Elementary School.

References

External links 

 
 Folklórico Jaguara
 Dallas ISD listing for Moisés E. Molina High School
 School profile (PDF)
 Attendance zone map (PDF)

Dallas Independent School District high schools
Public high schools in Dallas